Microplutodes is a genus of moths in the family Geometridae. The genus was erected by Jeremy Daniel Holloway in 1993.

Species
Microplutodes hilaropa (Meyrick, 1897) Borneo, Sumatra
Microplutodes tristis (Swinhoe, 1902) Philippines (Luzon)
Microplutodes iridaria (Debauche, 1941) Sulawesi

References

Plutodini